Theodora "Teddy" Quinlivan is an American model. She was discovered in 2015, by Nicolas Ghesquière,  Louis Vuitton's creative director.

Career 
In September 2017, Quinlivan came out as transgender. Her announcement was praised by Ghesquière, designer Marc Jacobs, make-up artist Pat McGrath, and others in the fashion industry.

She has walked for designers including Carolina Herrera, Jeremy Scott, Jason Wu, Dior, Louis Vuitton, and Saint Laurent.

In 2019, Quinlivan became the first openly transgender model to be hired by Chanel.

She was ranked as one of the "Top 50" models by models.com.

Quinlivan vowed to stop working for any designer or brand who worked with people accused of sexual misconduct after experiencing it herself.

Personal life 
Quinlivan grew up in Shrewsbury, Massachusetts. She studied art at Walnut Hill School for the Arts. She resides in New York City.

See also
 LGBT culture in New York City
 List of LGBT people from New York City

References

External links

1994 births
Female models from Massachusetts
Living people
Models from New York City
People from Boston
Transgender female models
LGBT people from Massachusetts
Louis Vuitton exclusive models